The Freedom 36 is an American sailboat, that was designed by Gary Mull and first built in 1985. The design is out of production.

Production
The boat was built by Tillotson Pearson in the United States for Freedom Yachts.

Design
The Freedom 36 is a small recreational keelboat, built predominantly of fiberglass, with wood trim. It has a free-standing fractional sloop rig, an internally-mounted spade-type rudder and a fixed fin keel. With the standard keel it displaces  and carries  of ballast. With the shoal keel it displaces .

The boat is fitted with a Japanese Yanmar 3GM diesel engine.

The boat has a PHRF racing average handicap of 147 with a high of 144 and low of 150.

The Freedom 36 design was developed into the Freedom 38 in 1989.

Variants
Freedom 36
Model with standard keel and  draft. It displaces  and carries  of ballast.
Freedom 36 SD
Model with shoal draft keel and  draft. It displaces .

See also
List of sailing boat types

References

Keelboats
1980s sailboat type designs
Sailing yachts
Sailboat type designs by Gary Mull
Sailboat types built by Pearson Yachts